Ide Schelling (born 6 February 1998 in The Hague) is a Dutch cyclist, who currently rides for UCI WorldTeam . In October 2020, he was named in the startlist for the 2020 Vuelta a España.

Major results

2015
 3rd Overall Ronde des Vallées
1st  Young rider classification
 5th Overall Keizer der Juniores
 5th Omloop der Vlaamse Gewesten
 8th Overall Sint-Martinusprijs Kontich
1st Stage 1 (TTT)
 9th Overall Driedaagse van Axel
2016
 1st  Overall Ronde des Vallées
1st Stage 1
 2nd Overall Oberösterreich Juniorenrundfahrt
1st  Mountains classification
 4th Overall Grand Prix Rüebliland
1st Stage 1
 6th Overall GP Général Patton
 7th Road race, UCI Junior Road World Championships
 7th Overall Internationale Niedersachsen-Rundfahrt der Junioren
1st  Mountains classification
2017
 1st  Mountains classification Grand Prix Priessnitz spa
2018
 4th Liège–Bastogne–Liège U23
2019
 6th Overall Ronde de l'Isard
 8th Overall Giro della Valle d'Aosta
1st Stage 1
2021
 1st Grosser Preis des Kantons Aargau
 2nd Overall Tour of Norway
 4th Brabantse Pijl
 4th Time trial, National Road Championships
 5th Overall Tour of Belgium
 5th Circuito de Getxo
 5th GP Industria & Artigianato di Larciano
 Tour de France
Held  after Stages 1 & 3–6
 Combativity award Stage 1
2023
 8th Muscat Classic

Grand Tour general classification results timeline

References

External links

1998 births
Living people
Dutch male cyclists
Cyclists from The Hague
21st-century Dutch people